Savukoski is a municipality of Finland.

It is located in the province of Lapland, Finland. Neighbour municipalities are Pelkosenniemi, Salla and Sodankylä.

The municipality is unilingually Finnish.

According to Finnish Folklore, the Korvatunturi Fell in Savukoski municipality is the location of Father Christmas's (Joulupukki) secret workshop, where toys, trinkets and gifts are made and eventually wrapped by gnomes. The name Korvatunturi translates into English as "Ear Fell". Finnish children are told that from "Ear Fell" Father Christmas can hear what all the children are saying so he can find out if the children behave and obey their parents (and therefore may receive gifts next Christmas).

Savukoski is one of the largest municipalities in Finland, areawise, and the most sparsely settled. The river Kemijoki runs through it. Forestry and reindeer husbandry have traditionally been the main livelihood of the local population. There are ten times more reindeer than people in Savukoski. Nowadays tourism is also getting more important.

The Urho Kekkonen National Park is also located partly in Savukoski.

A bog region called Äteritsiputeritsipuolilautatsijänkä is in Savukoski. It has the longest place name in Finland.

Notable people
 Markus Mustajärvi (born 1963), Finnish politician

See also 
 Seitajärvi, a former community in Savukoski

References

External links

 Municipality of Savukoski – Official website
 Korvatunturi – Ear Mountain
 Savukoski – The Home of Father Christmas

 
Populated places established in 1916